Paryeong Bridge (Hangul: 팔영대교) is a suspension bridge in the south coast of South Korea.

References

See also
 Transportation in South Korea
 List of bridges in South Korea

Suspension bridges in South Korea
Bridges completed in 2016
Road bridges